Pasi Juhani Rutanen (born. 23 October 1936, in Jyväskylä) is a Finnish journalist and diplomat.

Rutanen studied at the University of Helsinki and did same time cartoons and columns at the Ylioppilaslehti. After graduating as a bachelor of political science he went to Finnish Broadcasting Company. In the mid-1960s, he was sent to the United States as the first Washington  correspondent of the Finnish Broadcasting Company, until he moved to the diplomatic service in 1970.

Rutanen is especially remembered of the reports from Houston about of the Apollo 11 flight which landed on the moon.

Rutanen was an Ambassador from 1984 to 1987 in Manila and served as Deputy Director General of the Development Cooperation Department in the Ministry of Foreign Affairs between 1987 and 1989, as a negotiating officer from 1989 to 1991, Ambassador to Bangkok in years 1984–1986 Finland's ambassador to the OECD delegation in Paris 1991–1997 and Ambassador in Beijing 1997–2001

Rutanen lives with his American wife in Paris

References 

Ambassadors of Finland to the Philippines
Ambassadors of Finland to China
Ambassadors of Finland to Thailand
Finnish reporters and correspondents
1936 births
Finnish expatriates in France
People from Jyväskylä
Finnish columnists
Living people
Finnish diplomats